Following is a list of all Article III United States federal judges appointed by President James Madison during his presidency. In total Madison appointed 13 Article III federal judges, including 2 Justices to the Supreme Court of the United States, 2 judges to the United States circuit courts, and 9 judges to the United States district courts. One of Madison's district court appointments was in fact appointed twice, to succeed himself on the same court, having resigned from the first appointment to pursue another political office.

United States Supreme Court justices

Circuit courts

District courts

Notes

References
General

 

Specific

Sources
 Federal Judicial Center

Judicial appointments
Madison